Madison Charney (born October 5, 1994) is a Canadian skeleton racer who has competed since 2012. In 2014–15, she finished 9th at the 2014 FIBT World Junior Championships in Winterberg, Germany. She won the 2014 Canadian senior championships and had her first World Cup top-10 finish at Calgary in December 2014.

References

External links
 http://www.fibt.com/index.php?id=54&tx_bzdstaffdirectory_pi1%5BshowUid%5D=101087&tx_bzdstaffdirectory_pi1%5BbackPid%5D=96 (FIBT profile)
 

1994 births
Canadian female skeleton racers
Living people
Sportspeople from Calgary
20th-century Canadian women
21st-century Canadian women